Eldorado Glacier is on the south slopes of Eldorado Peak, North Cascades National Park, in the U.S. state of Washington. Eldorado Glacier is connected to Inspiration Glacier on its upper slopes.

See also
 
List of glaciers in the United States

References

Glaciers of the North Cascades
Glaciers of Skagit County, Washington
Glaciers of Washington (state)